Chan Sze Chun (born 22 April 1990) is a Hong Kong former footballer who played as a defender.

Career

In 2010, Chan trained with the youth academy of English Premier League side Birmingham after winning the Hong Kong reality television show A Kick to Success. Chan started his career with Citizen in the Hong Kong top flight, where he made 1 league appearance and scored 0 goals. On 20 January 2013, he debuted for Citizen during a 3–3 draw with Biu Chun Rangers. In 2013, Chan signed for Hong Kong second tier club HKFC. In 2016, he returned to HKFC in the Hong Kong top flight.

References

External links
 

1990 births
Association football defenders
Citizen AA players
Hong Kong FC players
Hong Kong footballers
Hong Kong First Division League players
Living people